Chaetostoma brevilabiatum is a species of catfish in the family Loricariidae. It is native to South America, where it occurs in the basins of the Magdalena River and the Cimitarra River in Colombia. The species reaches 11.9 cm (4.7 inches) SL and is known from high-altitude environments.

References 

brevilabiatum
Fish described in 1942
Catfish of South America
Taxa named by Georg Dahl